The National Investigation Agency (NIA) is the primary counter-terrorist task force of India. The agency is empowered to deal with the investigation of terror related crimes across states without special permission from the states under written proclamation from the Ministry of Home Affairs. The Agency came into existence with the enactment of the National Investigation Agency Act 2008 by the Parliament of India on 31 December 2008, which was passed after the deadly 26/11 terror attack in Mumbai. Such an attack revealed the failure of intelligence and ability to track such activities by existing agencies in India, hence the government of India realized the need of a specific body to deal with terror related activities in India, thereby establishing the NIA. Headquartered in New Delhi, the NIA has branches in Hyderabad, Guwahati, Kochi, Lucknow, Mumbai, Kolkata, Raipur, Jammu, Chandigarh, Ranchi, Chennai and Imphal. It maintains the NIA Most Wanted list.

The founding Director-General of NIA was Radha Vinod Raju, and he served until 31 January 2010. Currently Dinkar Gupta serves as its Director-General since 28 June 2022.

Bill 

A bill for the formation of the National Investigation Agency was passed by Parliament in December 2008. As per the bill, NIA has concurrent jurisdiction which empowers the Central Agency to probe terror attacks in any part of the country, covering offences, including challenge to the country's sovereignty and integrity, bomb blasts, hijacking of aircraft and ships, attacks on nuclear installations. The amendments to the NIA Act have brought the offences relating to the smuggling in High-Quality Counterfeit Indian Currency under the definition of a terrorist act aimed at damaging the monetary stability of the country and therefore can be investigated by the NIA.

The ground staff of the agency in the national capital could be drawn from existing central staff and security organisations while in the states, permanent deputation from the state police could be taken.

The National Investigative Agency Bill and Unlawful Activities (Prevention) Amendment Bill on Tuesday, 30 December 2008, became a law as President Pratibha Patil gave her assent to the legislation which was passed in the last session of the parliament.

NIA (Amendment) Bill 2019 
The NIA (Amendment) Bill 2019 was passed by the parliament on 17 July 2019. The Bill aims to give more teeth to the investigating powers of the NIA. It empowers the NIA to probe terror attacks targeting Indians and Indian interests abroad. The amended legislation, which aims to primarily empower the anti-terror agency to investigate scheduled offences such as human trafficking; circulation of fake currency; manufacture and sale of prohibited arms; and cyber-terrorism, was passed with a majority of 278 votes in favour and six against in the Lok Sabha. It was also passed in the Rajya Sabha after those opposed to it staged a walkout. This amendment will now also allow NIA to investigate the Sri Lanka Easter Bombings and Kabul Gurudwara bombing.

Vision
Agency aims to be a thoroughly professional investigative agency matching the best international standards. It aims to set the standards of excellence in counter terrorism and other national security related investigations at the national level by developing into a highly trained, partnership oriented workforce. It also aims at creating deterrence for existing and potential terrorist groups/individuals. It aims to develop as a storehouse of all terrorist related information.

Jurisdiction
The Agency has been empowered to conduct investigation and prosecution of offences under the Acts specified in the Schedule of the NIA Act. A State Government may request the Central Government to hand over the investigation of a case to the NIA, provided the case has been registered for the offences as contained in the schedule to the NIA Act. Central Government can also order NIA to take over investigation of any scheduled offense anywhere in the India. Officers of the NIA who are drawn from the Indian Police Service and Indian Revenue Service  have all powers, privileges and liabilities which the police officers have in connection with investigation of any offense.

In 2016 Home Minister Rajnath Singh wanted to end the central agency's dependence on approval from state police chiefs before confiscating or attaching assets of people accused of crime.

The National Investigation Agency (Amendment) Act, 2019 states that, officers of the NIA will have the power to investigate scheduled offences committed outside India, subject to international treaties and domestic laws of other countries. The central government may direct the NIA to investigate such cases, as if the offence has been committed in India. The Special Court in New Delhi will have jurisdiction over these cases.

Special NIA Courts
Various Special Courts have been notified by the Central Government of India for trial of the cases registered at various police stations of NIA under Section 11 and 22 of the NIA Act 2008. Any question as to the jurisdiction of these courts is decided by the Central Government. These are presided over by a judge appointed by the Central Government on the recommendation of the Chief Justice of the High Court with jurisdiction in that region. Supreme Court of India has also been empowered to transfer the cases from one special court to any other special court within or outside the state if the same is in the interest of justice in light of the prevailing circumstances in any particular state. The NIA Special Courts  are empowered with all powers of the court of sessions under Code of Criminal Procedure, 1973 for trial of any offense.

Trial by this courts are held on day-to-day basis on all working days and have precedence over the trial of any other case against the accused in any other court (not being a Special Court) and have to be concluded in preference to the trial of such other case. An appeal from any judgement, sentence or order, not being an interlocutory order, of a Special Court lies to the High Court both on facts and on law. Such an appeal can be heard by a division bench of two Judges of the High Court. At present there are 38 Special NIA Courts. State Governments have also been empowered to appoint one or more such special courts in their states.

Recent success of NIA

Individual terrorists 
In year 2012, NIA with the assistance of Interpol and Saudi Intelligence agencies has successfully arrested terrorists namely: Abu Jundal alias Abu Hamza, (Indian national), Fasih Mohammad and Yaseen Bhatkal (Indian Mujahideen).

In the year 2013, NIA was successful in arresting two senior members of Indian Mujahideen, namely Ahmed Siddibappa Zaraar alias Yasin Bhatkal and Asadullah Akhtar alias Haddi, from Indo Nepal border in Bihar on 29 August 2013. These two were instrumental in the commission of a number of terrorist attacks across the country for the past several years, under the banner of Indian Mujahideen,  a proscribed terrorist organisation.

Terrorist organisations

Jammu and Kashmir war on terror 
NIA has been active in the war against terror in Jammu and Kashmir. On 18 January 2019, NIA filed a chargesheet against 12 people including Lashkar-e-Taiba terror group chief Hafiz Saeed and Hizbul Mujahideen chief Syed Salahuddin. This chargesheet was filed after nearly eight months of investigations spanning six states in India during which over 300 witnesses were examined, 950 "incriminating documents" and 600 electronic devices were seized. NIA has also stated that the war against terror in Kashmir is not about terror funding alone, it's about a conspiracy to wage war against India. During the investigation the NIA has arrested people allegedly involved in stone-pelting incidents for the first time including Kashmiri photojournalist Kamran Yusuf.

Naxals 
It has identified two Naxalite commanders in Bastar who were part of the ambush that killed almost the entire Congress' Chhattisgarh top brass.

Constitutionality
Under the constitution of India, law and order is a state subject. There have been questions raised on how NIA is usurping state rights under the guise of fighting terror. In 2020 Chhatishgarh state filed a case against the act in the supreme court that the said act violates the constitution. A US Embassy cable accessed by The Hindu says that union home minister P Chidambaram, in his discussion with FBI Director Robert Mueller, was coming 'perilously close to crossing constitutional limits' in empowering the NIA, and also that the National Investigation Agency's powers could be challenged in the courts as violating constitutional provisions on Centre-State relations. These ambiguities that the states' privilege is being encroached upon by the Centre using this act are resolved using the 'doctrine of Pith and Substance'.

In popular culture
NIA has been depicted in the Amazon Prime Video's series The Family Man featuring Manoj Bajpayee in the role of an NIA officer named Srikant Tiwari.

See also
 Central Bureau of Investigation, anti organised crime which are international, multi-state or multi-agency 
 Directorate of Revenue Intelligence, anti-smuggling 
 Enforcement Directorate, anti economic crimes
 Narcotics Control Bureau, anti drug trafficking 
 Financial Intelligence Unit, anti money laundering
 NIA Most Wanted, terrorists
 List of Indian intelligence agencies

References

External links
 
 NIA act

2009 establishments in Delhi
Counterterrorism in India
Executive branch of the government of India
Indian intelligence agencies
Government agencies established in 2009
Federal law enforcement agencies of India
Government agencies of India
Ministry of Home Affairs (India)
Domestic intelligence agencies